The South Tees Motorsports Park is a purpose-built motorcycle speedway stadium located at South Bank, Middlesbrough, England. The stadium is the home track for the Redcar Bears and is currently known as the ECCO Arena because of the clubs primary sponsor ECCO Finishing Supplies.

History
The stadium opened on 13 April 2006. It was the first time since 1996 that Middlesbrough had hosted speedway following the closure of the Cleveland Park Stadium.

The stadium was formerly known as the Media Prime Arena until the beginning of the SGB Championship 2022 season, named after one of the clubs primary sponsors at the time Media Prima.

See also
Redcar Bears

References

Speedway venues in England
Sports venues in Middlesbrough